In mathematical physics, a Gibbons–Hawking space, named after Gary Gibbons and Stephen Hawking, is essentially a hyperkähler manifold with an extra U(1) symmetry. (In general, Gibbons–Hawking metrics are a subclass of hyperkähler metrics.) Gibbons–Hawking spaces, especially ambipolar ones, find an application in the study of black hole microstate geometries.

See also
Gibbons–Hawking effect

References

Structures on manifolds
Complex manifolds
Riemannian manifolds
Algebraic geometry
Stephen Hawking